Harry Toole (7 September 1897 – 13 August 1958) was a former Australian rules footballer who played with Carlton in the Victorian Football League (VFL).

Notes

External links 
		
Harry Toole's profile at Blueseum

1897 births
1958 deaths
Australian rules footballers from Victoria (Australia)
Carlton Football Club players